Jose Manuel Sabucedo is a Spanish social psychologist, professor at Universidade de Santiago de Compostela. He is an expert in collective action and political violence and reconciliation, and an author of influential publications in these fields. Sabucedo is director of the research group on social behaviour and applied psychometrics at USC. He is also president of the Spanish Scientific Society of Social Psychology (SCEPS), and associate editor of peer-reviewed Revista Latinoamericana de Psicología since 2009. He was also editor-in-chief of Revista de Psicología Social/International Journal of Social Psychology between 2010 and 2016. Throughout his academic career, he also supervised 18 doctoral theses. In 2007 Sabucedo received the Galicia Research Prize in the senior category, recognising 25 years of research in social and political psychology, characterised by interdisciplinarity and high social relevance.

References

Living people
Spanish psychologists
Academic staff of the University of Santiago de Compostela
Social psychologists
University of Santiago de Compostela alumni
1955 births